The Serpentine Galleries are two contemporary art galleries in Kensington Gardens, Hyde Park, Central London. Recently rebranded to just Serpentine, the organisation is split across Serpentine South, previously known as the Serpentine Gallery, and Serpentine North, previously known as the Sackler Gallery. The gallery spaces are within five minutes' walk of each other, linked by the bridge over the Serpentine Lake from which the galleries get their names. Their exhibitions, architecture, education and public programmes attract up to 1.2 million visitors a year. Admission to both galleries is free. The CEO is Bettina Korek, and the artistic director Hans Ulrich Obrist.

Serpentine South
Serpentine South, previously known as the Serpentine Gallery, was established in 1970 and is housed in a Grade II listed former tea pavilion built in 1933–34 by the architect James Grey West. Notable artists whose works have been exhibited there include Man Ray, Henry Moore, Jean-Michel Basquiat, Andy Warhol, Paula Rego, Sondra Perry, Bridget Riley, Allan McCollum, Anish Kapoor, Christian Boltanski, Philippe Parreno, Richard Prince, Wolfgang Tillmans, Gerhard Richter, Gustav Metzger, Damien Hirst, Maria Lassnig, Jeff Koons and Marina Abramović. On the ground at the gallery's entrance is a permanent work made by Ian Hamilton Finlay in collaboration with Peter Coates, and dedicated to Diana, Princess of Wales, the gallery's former patron.

Serpentine North

In 2013 Serpentine North was opened to the public named as the Serpentine Sackler Gallery, a name changed to Serpentine North on 2021. This gave new life to The Magazine, a Grade II* listed former gunpowder store built in 1805, with the addition of an extension designed by Zaha Hadid Architects. Located five minutes' walk from Serpentine South across the Serpentine Bridge, it comprises 900 square metres of gallery space, restaurant, shop and social space. The Magazine Restaurant adjoins the gallery space.

Pavilions
Every year since 2000, Serpentine has commissioned a temporary summer pavilion by a leading architect. The series presents the work of an international architect or design team who has not completed a building in England at the time of the Gallery's invitation. Each Pavilion is completed within six months and is situated on the Serpentine South's lawn for three months for the public to explore.
 2000: Zaha Hadid
 2001: Daniel Libeskind
 2002: Toyo Ito
 2003: Oscar Niemeyer
 2005: Álvaro Siza and Eduardo Souto de Moura
 2006: Rem Koolhaas
 2007 pre-pavilion 'Lilias': Zaha Hadid and Patrik Schumacher
 2007: Olafur Eliasson and Kjetil Thorsen
 2008: Frank Gehry
 2009: SANAA
 2010: Jean Nouvel
 2011: Peter Zumthor with Piet Oudolf
 2012: Ai Weiwei and Herzog & de Meuron
 2013: Sou Fujimoto
 2014: Smiljan Radic
 2015: Selgas Cano
 2016: Bjarke Ingels
 2017: Diébédo Francis Kéré
 2018: Frida Escobedo
 2019: Junya Ishigami
 2021: Sumayya Vally, Counterspace
 2022: Theaster Gates

Gallery of temporary pavilions

See also

References

External links

 
 Collection of articles about the Serpentine Pavilions at The Guardian

1970 establishments in England
Art galleries established in 1970
Art museums established in 1970
Buildings and structures in Hyde Park, London
Contemporary art galleries in London
Grade II* listed buildings in the City of Westminster
Grade II listed buildings in the City of Westminster
Kensington Gardens
Modern architecture in the United Kingdom
Museums in the City of Westminster
SANAA buildings
Ai Weiwei buildings